Maidie Ruth Norman (October 16, 1912 – May 2, 1998) was an American radio, stage, film, and television actress as well as an instructor in African-American literature and theater.

Early life
Norman was born Maidie Ruth Gamble on a plantation in Villa Rica, Georgia, to Louis and Lila Graham Gamble. She was raised in Lima, Ohio, and began studying drama and performing in Shakespeare plays as a child. She graduated from Central High School in Lima in 1930, and attended Bennett College in Greensboro, North Carolina, where she earned a Bachelor of Arts in 1934. She then got her master's degree in drama at Columbia University in 1937.

She married real-estate broker McHenry Norman on December 22, 1937. She later used her husband's surname as her professional name.

Career

Acting
Norman began her career in radio with appearances on The Jack Benny Program and Amos 'n' Andy. In 1946, she began studying at the Actors' Laboratory Theatre in Hollywood. She made her stage debut in 1949 as Honey in Deep Are the Roots at the Mayan Theater in Los Angeles.

In 1947, Norman made her film debut in The Peanut Man. She initially found it difficult to find positive roles in films for African-American women and felt limited in playing maids and domestics. While she did appear in such roles, Norman refused to portray these characters in a subservient or stereotypical manner that was considered the norm. She later said "In the beginning, I made a pledge that I would play no role that deprived black women of their dignity."

Norman appeared in her only leading role in 1951, playing Martha Crawford in The Well. She later appeared in supporting roles in Torch Song (1953), Bright Road (1953), Susan Slept Here (1954), The Opposite Sex (1956), and Written on the Wind (1956). One of her more memorable roles was as the ill-fated housekeeper Elvira Stitt in Robert Aldrich's 1962 horror film What Ever Happened to Baby Jane?, with Bette Davis and Joan Crawford. In a 1995 interview, Norman recalled that the character was originally written as a "doltish, yessum character". She rewrote the dialogue, which she called "old slavery-time talk", in an effort to dignify the character.

During the 1960s and for the remainder of her career, Norman appeared mainly in television roles because she believed more opportunities existed for African-American performers in the medium. Her TV credits include appearances in The Loretta Young Show, Perry Mason, Alfred Hitchcock Presents, Ben Casey, and Dr. Kildare. In 1961, she appeared in the Los Angeles production of A Raisin in the Sun.

In the 1970s and 1980s, Norman guest-starred on episodes of Good Times, The Jeffersons, Little House on the Prairie, and The Streets of San Francisco. Her last film role was in Terrorist on Trial: The United States vs. Salim Ajami (1988), and the same year, she made her television appearances in the American sitcom Amen, the TV movie Side by Side, and an episode of Simon & Simon.

Teaching
At the height of her career during the 1950s, Norman toured colleges lecturing on African-American literature and theater. From 1955 to 1956, she taught at the University of Texas at Tyler. Norman was also an artist-in-residence at Stanford University from 1968 to 1969. In 1970, she created and taught a course in African-American theater history at UCLA. It was the first course devoted to the subject of African-American studies in the college's history. Norman taught at UCLA until 1977. In her honor, UCLA established the Maidie Norman Research Award for the best student essay on African-American film or theater.

Personal life
On December 22, 1937, she married real estate broker McHenry Norman, whom she met while attending Bennett College. They had one son, McHenry Norman III. They were married until McHenry's death. In 1977, Norman married Weldon D. Canada, to whom she remained married until her death.

Death
Norman died of lung cancer on May 2, 1998, at her son's home in San Jose, California. Her funeral was held at the Alum Rock United Methodist Church in San Jose on May 12. She was cremated per The Neptune Society and her ashes scattered at sea.

Honors
Norman was invited to serve as an official delegate of the Methodist Church for a conference on human relations held February 11–13, 1958 at the First Methodist Church of Glendale and sponsored by the Southern California-Arizona Conference Board of Christian Social Relations and the General Board of Social and Economic Relations.

In 1977, she was inducted into the Black Filmmakers Hall of Fame.

In 1985, California Educational Theatre Association gave her a professional artist award.

In 1992, Norman was awarded an honorary doctorate from Bennett College, her alma mater.

Filmography

Television credits

References

External links

 

1912 births
1998 deaths
20th-century American actresses
Actresses from Georgia (U.S. state)
Actresses from Ohio
American radio actresses
Bennett College alumni
Burials in Georgia (U.S. state)
Columbia University School of the Arts alumni
Deaths from lung cancer
People from Lima, Ohio
University of California, Los Angeles faculty
American television actresses
African-American actresses
American film actresses
American stage actresses
American Shakespearean actresses
20th-century Methodists
American United Methodists
African-American Methodists
University of Texas at Tyler faculty
Stanford University faculty